The IFTA Film & Drama Awards are awards given by the Irish Film & Television Academy for Irish television and film, the awards began in 1999. The ceremonies recognise Irish creative talent working in film, drama, and television, and winners receive a cast bronze statuette.

History 
Dubbed by the media as 'The Irish Oscars', the inaugural Irish Film & Television Awards Ceremony took place at the Burlington Hotel (Dublin) in 1999, and was attended by some notable stars such as Ralph Fiennes, Charlize Theron, James Nesbitt, and Andrea Corr. Following growth of the Irish film and television industries, the Academy in 2015 split the Awards into two ceremonies: the IFTA Film & Drama Awards and the IFTA Television Awards, which take place in April and October respectively. The ceremonies recognise Irish creative talent working in film and television. Winners receive a cast bronze statuette.

Categories

Film
 Best Film
 Best Director
 Best Script
 Best Actor in a leading role
 Best Actress in a leading role
  Best Supporting Actor
 Best Supporting Actress
 Rising Star
 George Morrison Feature Documentary Award

Short Film
 Best Animated Short
 Best Short Film

Television drama
 Best Drama
 Best Director
 Best Lead Actor
 Best Lead Actress
 Best Supporting Actor
 Best Supporting Actress

Craft
 Best Cinematography
 Best Editing
 Best Production Design
 Best VFX
 Best Make Up & Hair
 Best Sound
 Best Costume
 Best Original Music

Previous ceremonies 

The following is a listing of all Irish Film Television Awards Ceremonies since its inaugural event in 1999.

References

External links 
 

 
Awards established in 2003
Irish film awards
Irish television awards